Vanda insignis is a species of orchid endemic to the Lesser Sunda Islands.

References 

insignis
Orchids of the Lesser Sunda Islands
Epiphytic orchids